The Poppy.Computer Tour was the second concert tour and first international tour by American singer Poppy. The tour supports the singer's debut studio album, Poppy.Computer (2017). Starting in the fall of 2017, the tour played 34 cities and included 38 concerts in North America, one concert in the United Kingdom in December, and one show in Tokyo, Japan in January, 2018.

Background

Poppy announced plans of touring via Twitter, alongside her album announcement, on May 6, 2017. In late July, the concert schedule was released, showing 15 shows in the United States and Canada. This was followed with a 21-minute video posted on YouTube, where the singer stands in front of different backgrounds with two background artists. High demand added additional shows in Los Angeles and Chicago. The tour played in small venues and clubs, with a capacity of 400 or less. The setlist features nine tracks from the album and one from her 2016 EP. The show resembles Poppy's  videos, featuring appearances from Titanic Sinclair and Charlotte the Mannequin.

A single show occurred in London on December 13, 2017, another in Tokyo on January 13, 2018, and a third in Mexico City on April 27, 2018.

Opening acts
Charlotte the Mannequin

Setlist
The following setlist was from the November 3, 2017 concert, held at Stubb's in Austin, Texas. It does not represent all concerts for the duration of the tour.
"I'm Poppy"
"Computer Boy"
"Moshi Moshi"
"Bleach Blonde Baby"
"Interweb"
"Let's Make a Video"
"My Style"
"My Microphone"
"Software Upgrade"
Encore
"Money"
Notes
"Lowlife" was performed in Mexico City during the 4th leg.

Tour dates

Box office score data

References

External links
Poppy Official Website

2017 concert tours
2018 concert tours
Poppy (entertainer)